Island of the Dead (German: Toteninsel) is a 1921 German drama film directed by Carl Froelich and starring Lil Dagover, Bernhard Goetzke and Walter Janssen.

The film's sets were designed by the art directors Robert Herlth, Walter Röhrig and Hermann Warm.

Cast
 Lil Dagover
 Bernhard Goetzke
 Walter Janssen
 Gertrud von Hoschek

References

Bibliography
 Hardt, Ursula. From Caligari to California: Erich Pommer's life in the International Film Wars. Berghahn Books, 1996.

External links

1921 films
Films of the Weimar Republic
German silent feature films
Films directed by Carl Froelich
German black-and-white films
German drama films
1921 drama films
Silent drama films
1920s German films
1920s German-language films